Salvatore Caturano (born July 3, 1990) is an Italian professional footballer who plays as a striker for  club Potenza.

Club career

Empoli 
He made his debut in the Serie A on May 13, 2007 for Empoli in a game against Siena when he came on as a substitute for Davide Matteini in the 80th minute at the age of 16 years, 10 months and 10 days.

Loan to Taranto 
After had made his Serie B debut in a 2–2 home draw against Brescia, on 1 September 2008 he was loaned to Serie C side Taranto on a season-long loan deal. On 14 September he made his Serie C debut for Taranto as a substitute replacing Davide Dionigi in the 63rd minute of a 1–1 home draw against Benevento. On 21 September, Caturano played his first match as a starter and he scored his first professional goal in the 8th minute of a 1–0 away win over ASD Progreditur Marcianise, he was replaced by Tommaso Marolda in the 70th minute, one week later he played his first entire match, a 2–0 away defeat against Arezzo. On 16 November, Caturano scored his second goal, as a substitute, in the 90th minute of a 3–0 home win over Virtus Lanciano. On 18 January 2009 he scored twice in a 3-0 home win over Città di Foligno. Caturano ended his loan to Taranto with 28 appearances and 5 goals.

Loan to Viareggio 
After had make only 1 appearance for Empoli in the first part of the season in Coppa Italia, on 1 January 2010, Caturano was signed by Serie C club Viareggio on a 6-month loan deal. On 24 January he made his debut for Viareggio as a substitute replacing Mirko Guadalupi in the 86th minute of a 1–1 away draw against Como. On 31 January, Caturano played his first match as a starter for Viareggio, a 0–0 home draw against Monza, he was replaced by Umberto Eusepi in the 65th minute. On 2 May he scored twice in a 2–2 away draw against Sorrento, one week later he played his first entire match for Viareggio, a 2–2 home draw against Benevento. On 23 May he scored his third goal in the 79th minute of a 1–1 away draw against Paganese in the Serie C play-out. Caturano ended his 6-month loan to Viareggio with 12 appearances and 2 goals.

Loan to Ravenna and Andria BAT 
On 1 August 2010, Caturano was loaned to Serie C side Ravenna on a 6-month loan deal. On 22 August, Caturano made his Serie C debut as a starter in a 2–1 away win over Como, he was replaced by Luca Gerbino Polo in the 56th minute. On 29 August he played his first entire match for Ravenna and he scored his first goal in the 36th minute of a 1–1 home draw against Bassano Virtus. On 19 September he scored his second goal in the 2nd minute of a 3–2 away defeat against Sorrento. On 14 November he scored his third goal in the 16th minute of a 2–1 home win over Lumezzane. Caturano ended his loan to Ravenna with 17 appearances, 15 as a starter, and 3 goals.

On 1 January 2011, Caturano was signed by Serie C side Andria BAT on a 6-month loan deal. On 23 January he made his Serie C debut for Andria BAT as a substitute replacing Giuseppe Lacarra in the 78th minute of a 1–1 away draw against Lucchese. On 13 March he played his first match as a starter, a 1–0 home defeat against Foggia, he was replaced by Giuseppe Cozzolino in the 55th minute. On 20 March he played his first entire match for Andria BAT, a 3–1 away defeat against Juve Stabia. Caturano ended his loan with only 3 appearances.

Loan to Nocerina and Foligno 
On 1 July 2011, Caturano was signed by Serie B club Nocerina on a 6-month loan deal. On 14 August he made his debut for Nocerina as a substitute replacing Diego Farias in the 64th minute of a 2–0 home win over Foggia in the second round of Coppa Italia. On 24 September he made his Serie B debut as a substitute replacing Alessandro Bruno in the 82nd minute of a 2–1 home defeat against Torino. On 29 October he played his second match for Nocerina, again as a substitute, a 4–2 home win over Sampdoria. On 1 November, Caturato played his first match as a starter, a 2–0 away defeat against Empoli, he was replaced by Emanuele Catania in the 46th minute. Caturato ended his loan to Nocerina with 4 appearances and 1 assist.

On 1 January 2012, Caturano was loaned to Serie C club Foligno on a 6-month loan deal. On 15 January he made his Serie C debut for Foligno playing the entire match and scoring his first goal for the club in the 85th minute of a 2–2 away draw against Como. On 5 February he scored his second goal in the 11th minute of a 1–1 home draw against Reggiana. On 4 April he scored his third goal in the 37th minute of a 1–1 home draw against Viareggio. Caturato ended his 6-month loan to Foligno with 16 appearances and 3 goals.

Loan to Paganese 
On 1 July 2012, Caturato was signed by Serie C club Paganese on a season-long loan deal. On 5 August he made his debut for Paganese as a substitute replacing Luca Orlando in the 62nd minute of a 1–0 away defeat against Nocerina in the first round of Coppa Italia. On 23 September he made his Serie C debut for Paganese as a substitute replacing Luca Orlando in the 71st minute of a 0–0 home draw against Catanzaro. On 9 December, Caturato played his first match as a starter and he scored his first goal for the club in the 34th minute of a 2–2 away draw against Frosinone, he was replaced by Dino Fava in the 74th minute. On 28 March he scored his second goal in the 30th minute of a 1–1 home draw against Latina. On 21 January he played his first entire match for Paganese and he scored twice in a 4–1 home win over Avellino. Caturano ended  his season-long loan to Paganese with 21 appearances and 6 goals.

Virtus Entella
On 16 August 2018, he joined Virtus Entella on loan from Lecce. Virtus Entella held an option to purchase him at the end of the loan, that option could turn into an obligation if certain conditions were met. He joined the club permanently on a 3-year contract at the end of the season.

Cesena
On 22 January 2020, he signed with Serie C club Cesena until the end of the 2019–20 season.

Potenza
On 6 August 2022, Caturano moved to Potenza on a two-year contract.

Career statistics

Club

Honours

Club 
Lecce

 Serie C: 2017–18

Virtus Entella

 Serie C:  2018-19

References

External links
 
 Career summary on WLecce.it

1990 births
Living people
Footballers from Naples
Italian footballers
Association football forwards
Serie A players
Serie B players
Serie C players
Empoli F.C. players
Taranto F.C. 1927 players
F.C. Esperia Viareggio players
Ravenna F.C. players
S.S. Fidelis Andria 1928 players
A.S.G. Nocerina players
A.S.D. Città di Foligno 1928 players
Paganese Calcio 1926 players
Casertana F.C. players
A.C.R. Messina players
A.S. Melfi players
S.S.C. Bari players
Ascoli Calcio 1898 F.C. players
U.S. Lecce players
Virtus Entella players
Cesena F.C. players
Potenza Calcio players
Italy youth international footballers